Animal Nightlife was a British group in the 1980s. It consisted of Andy Polaris on vocals, Leonardo Chignoli on bass, Steve Brown on guitar, Billy Chapman on saxophone and Paul Waller on drums.

History
Founded in 1980 in the London night club scene, their sound has been described as white funk or cool jazz – a 1980s dance sound that is rooted in blues, soul, R&B and jazz.
Their debut single, "Love Is Just The Great Pretender" and the follow-up "Native Boy", came out on the Innervision label. The latter entered the UK Singles Chart at Number 60 in 1983. In August 1984, they reached Number 25 with "Mr. Solitaire", their most successful release. They hit the chart again in July 1985 with a re-recording of "Love is Just the Great Pretender", which reached Number 28.

Their first album, Shangri-La, was released on Island Records a month later in August 1985. The band ended its recording career in 1988 after the release of their second album, Lush Life, on Virgin subsidiary 10 Records. In November 2016, Shangri-la was re-issued in a deluxe two-CD edition by Cherry Red.
 
Frontman Andy Polaris recently resurfaced creating fashionable window displays in Dalston's Oxfam shop.

Discography

Albums
 1985: Shangri-La
 "Native Boy"
 "Waiting for the Bait to Bite"
 "Perfect Match"
 "Love is Just the Great Pretender '85"
 "Insomniazz"
 "Lazy Afternoon"
 "Between Lovers"
 "After Hours"
 "Basic Ingredients"
 "Throw in the Towel"
 "Bittersweet"
 "Mr Solitaire"

Shangri-la was released on Island Records (ILPS 9830). It entered the UK Albums Chart on 24 August 1985, and remained in the chart for six weeks, reaching number 36. The original vinyl release did not include 'Lazy Afternoon' or 'Mr Solitaire'.
 1987: Lush Life
 "Why Couldn't Your Black Heart Tell a White Lie"
 "Always Your Humble Slave"
 "TV Scene"
 "Sweet Smell of Success"
 "Boys With the Best Intentions"
 "Luck"
 "The War I Lost"
 "Mouth"
 "Last Hotel of the World"
 "Breakaway"

Singles
Animal Nightlife had four singles in the UK Singles Chart during the 1980s.

Band members
 Andy Polaris - vocals (1980–1988)
 Sally Gissing - vocals (1980–1981)
 Lynn Harding - vocals (1980–1981)
 Leah Seresin - vocals (1981–1983)
 Chrysta Jones - vocals (1981–1983)
 Billy Chapman - saxophone (1980–1988) 
 Declan John Barclay - trumpet (1980–1983)
 Steve Brown - guitar (1980–1988)
 Steve Shanley - bass (1980–1983)
 Leonardo Chignoli - bass (1984–1988)
 Michael "Mac" McDermott - percussion (1980–1983)
 Dee C. Lee - vocals (occasional)
 Marc "Yellowcoat" Kingman - backing vocals (occasional)
 Paul Waller - drums (1980–1986)

References

External links
Glamour, Camaraderie, Culture and Union; the world of Animal Nightlife

English pop music groups
English jazz ensembles
Musical groups established in 1980
Musical groups disestablished in 1988
Innervision Records artists
Island Records artists